Seoul City Hall is a governmental building for the Seoul Metropolitan Government in South Korea, in charge of the administrative affairs of Seoul. It is located in Taepyeongno, Jung-gu, at the heart of Seoul. It is connected to City Hall Station (Seoul)  on Seoul Subway Line 1, with access to Seoul Subway Line 2 from the same station. In front of the current city hall is the old city hall building, now Seoul Metropolitan Library, and Seoul Plaza.

History

The former city hall of Seoul was built in 1925, during the Japanese occupation of Korea. It is an example of Imperial Crown Style architecture, and served as city hall from Korea's liberation in 1945, until construction of the modern building in 2008. It now houses the Seoul Metropolitan Library, in front of the current, modern Seoul City Hall building.

Following a competition for a new city hall, the jury awarded the commission to Yoo Kerl of iArc on February 18, 2008. Yoo said, "Major keywords for designing the new building are traditions, citizens, future. I analysed low-rise horizontal elements, curvaceousness, and shades of leaves in our traditional architectural characteristics, and I applied these to the design so I can recall comfortable feelings of old things."

In 2012, the new City Hall was opened to the public on 27 August and the city government moved in on 1 September. The project, which took four years and five months to complete, also includes multipurpose halls and cultural facilities for citizens. The old building, registered as a cultural asset, has been converted into a library, and boasts a collection of more than 200,000 books.

Public transportation
   City Hall Station (Seoul)

See also 
 List of government agencies of South Korea

References

External links 

 Seoul Metropolitan Government(Korean site)

Buildings and structures in Seoul
Government of Seoul
Seats of local government
Imperial Crown Style architecture
Jung District, Seoul